Claude Evrard (29 July 1933 – 20 April 2020) was a French actor.

Filmography

Cinema
La Foire aux cancres (1963)
Circus Angel (1965) - L'homme volé
Les ruses du diable (Neuf portraits d'une jeune fille) (1966)
Voilà l'ordre (1966, Short)
Un idiot à Paris (1967)
Le Dimanche de la vie (1967) - Le gendarme
Le Distrait (1970) - Figuier
La Coqueluche (1971)
L'accalmie (1973)
Chobizenesse (1975) - Chrétien Boussenard
Maria Chapdelaine (1983) - Caumartin
Paulette, la pauvre petite milliardaire (1986) - Le commissaire
 (1986) - Leon
If the Sun Never Returns (1987) - Follonier
Fucking Fernand (1987) - Mercier
De guerre lasse (1987) - Un passeur
La Maison assassinée (1988) - Gaspard Dupin
La Petite Amie (1988) - Picard
Cher frangin (1989) - Le père d'Alain
Toujours seuls (1991) - M. Chevillard
Blind Date (2015) - Vleux voisin
Back to Burgundy (2017)

Television
La Belle Équipe (1958-1962) - Un employé de bureau / Un valet de chambre / Un mexicain / Eugène Pastel, le violoncelliste
Cyrano de Bergerac (1960, TV Movie) - Un pâtissier
Au théâtre  ce soir - Le Minotaure (1969) - Gérard Forestier
Les Nouvelles Aventures de Vidocq (1971) - Le gardien de prison de Melun
Les enquêtes du commissaire Maigret (1971) - Le lieutenant Daniélou
Quentin Durward (1971)
Minichronique (1977) - Fouissard / L'homme à l'imperméable
Le Boulanger de Suresnes (1981, TV Movie) - Georges - le tabac
Le Cerisaie (1982, TV Movie) - Epikhodau
Claire (1986, TV Movie) - Fernand
L'Affaire Marie Besnard (1986, TV Movie) - Le docteur Beroud
Les Cinq Dernières Minutes (1994) - Philippe La Vaulx
Éclats de famille (1994, TV Movie) - Lucien

References

1933 births
2020 deaths
French male actors
People from Versailles
Deaths from the COVID-19 pandemic in France